Alinagar Assembly constituency is an assembly constituency in Darbhanga district in the Indian state of Bihar.

Overview
As per Delimitation of Parliamentary and Assembly constituencies Order, 2008, No. 81 Alinagar Assembly constituency is composed of the following: Alinagar, Tardih, Motipur Panchayat "Earlier Antour Panchayat (Antour, Motipur, Andauli) and Ghanshyampur community development blocks.

Alinagar Assembly constituency is part of No. 14 Darbhanga (Lok Sabha constituency).

History of Alinagar block
Earlier Alnagar was under Benipur block, since administrative block was far from public reach and due to limited availability of transportation for the people of the village in Alinagar, it was difficult for the public to access the administrative block easily. Then there was a formation of Alinagar block which is under Benipur division. Then have crafted new panchayat and dissolved some of the old panchayat and village under new block.

New panchayat and village are - Alinagar, Tardih, Motipur Panchayat "Earlier Antour Panchayat (Antour, Motipur, Andauli)  and Ghanshyampur

While forming Alinagar block, they have dissolved Antour panchayat which was having [Antour], Motipur, Balha and Nandapati village in it. Now Antour is part of Motipur panchayat which is new and came into force after dissolving Antour panchayat. Balha and Nandapati is part of Benipur division. 

After formation of new block Alinagar, it becomes difficult for people in the village Antour to access the Administrative block in Alinagar since it is in the neighbourhood of Benipur division. And the nearest railway station is Benipur which is .3 km from Antour village and administrative blocks of Benipur are 2 km from village Antour and new administrative block for Antour which is Alinagar is 10 km from village Antour in the opposite direction of the main market which is in Benipur.

Members of Legislative Assembly

Election results

2020

2015

See also
Treaty of Pratap Nagar

References

External links
 

Assembly constituencies of Bihar
Politics of Darbhanga district